The 2013–14 FC Terek Grozny season was the sixth successive season that Terek played in the Russian Premier League, the highest tier of football in Russia. They finished the season in 12th place and reached the Quarter-finals of the Russian Cup where they were defeated by CSKA Moscow.

Terek Grozny appointed Yuri Krasnozhan during pre-season, following the expiration of Stanislav Cherchesov contract. On 28 October 2013 Krasnozhan resigned as manager of Terek with them 14th in the table, Vait Talgayev was appointed as a caretaker manager the following day. After a week with Vait Talgayev in charge, Terek appointed Rashid Rakhimov as their permanent successor to Yuri Krasnozhan.

Squad

Transfers

In

Out

Loans in

Loans out

Competitions

Russian Premier League

Results by round

Results

League table

Russian Cup

Squad statistics

Appearances and goals

|-
|colspan="14"|Players away from Terek Grozny on loan:

|-
|colspan="14"|Players who appeared for Terek Grozny no longer at the club:

|}

Goal scorers

Clean sheets

Disciplinary record

Notes

References

FC Akhmat Grozny seasons
Terek Grozny